Teollisuuden Voima Oyj (TVO; , Industrial Power Corporation) is a Finnish nuclear power company owned by a consortium of power and industrial companies.

The biggest shareholders are Pohjolan Voima and Fortum. The company operates Olkiluoto Nuclear Power Plant, which consists of two BWRs (boiling water reactors), an EPR (European Pressurized Reactor) which reached first criticality in 2021, and one half of a coal-fired power plant along with a wind farm.

The third reactor at Olkiluoto was expected to be ready in 2009, but last estimate is 2021. TVO has filed compensation claim for delays, and Areva-Siemens have counter-claimed against TVO. Arbitrators at the International Chamber of Commerce are considering the claims.

On 21 April 2010, the Government of Finland decided to grant a permit for construction of fourth reactor at Olkiluoto. The decision was approved by the Parliament on 1 July 2010. In 2014 this permit expired, and was not renewed by the government.

In January 2015 TVO announced plans to save around $17.7 million per year through 'efficiency-related structural changes' which are expected to cause up to 110 job cuts. The CEO of TVO, Jarmo Tanhua, explained the reasons as:

An October 2016 story in the Süddeutsche Zeitung reports that TVO is calling on Siemens to take financial responsibility for the completion of unit3 of the Olkiluoto Nuclear Power Plant, because its project partner, the French Areva Group, is being broken up by the French government.

See also

 Nuclear power in Finland

References

External links

Nuclear power companies of Finland
Energy companies established in 1969
Eurajoki
Finnish companies established in 1969
Fortum